Wumpus may refer to:
 Hunt the Wumpus, a 1973 grid-based "survival horror" computer game
 Elleston Trevor, who wrote a series of children's books about a character named "Wumpus"
 Discord, a chat application which features a character named "Wumpus" as its mascot

See also
 Wampus (disambiguation)